Roxy Film is a German film production company established in 1951 by Luggi Waldleitner. During the 1950s, it was a leading producer with films such as melodramas which continued the traditions of the 1930s and 1940s. During the 1960s the company struggled, partly due to fierce competition from other producers such as Rialto Films which were better at using new genres such as Edgar Wallace thrillers and Karl May westerns. By the late 1960s the company had begun to specialise in making sex comedies, but in the 1970s moved to producing adaptations of classic literature and funding ambitious projects by members of the New German Cinema such as Rainer Werner Fassbinder.

References

Bibliography
 Bock, Hans-Michael & Bergfelder, Tim. The Concise CineGraph. Encyclopedia of German Cinema. Berghahn Books, 2009.

German film studios
Film production companies of Germany
Mass media companies established in 1951
1951 establishments in West Germany